Grajski biki is a 1967 Yugoslav film directed by Jože Pogačnik. Its international English title is Stronghold of Toughs.

Plot summary
The film is a somber social drama in which war orphans rebel against teachers and authority figures in their reform school. It stars Danny, a teen punk who organizes a breakout, only to become a victim of the code of toughness by which he lives. Sex and violence are included in the sometimes confusing story that appeared at the Mannheim Film Festival in 1967.

External links

References

Yugoslav drama films
Slovenian drama films
1967 films
Slovene-language films